This is a list of the seasons completed by the Marshall Thundering Herd men's basketball.

Season results

Notes

References
General
 

Specific

 
Marshall Thundering Herd
Marshall Thundering Herd basketball seasons